Kimi Koivisto (born December 31, 1992) is a Finnish ice hockey player. His is currently playing with KooKoo in the Finnish Liiga.

Koivisto made his Liiga debut playing with Lahti Pelicans during the 2011–12 SM-liiga season.

References

External links

1992 births
Living people
Finnish ice hockey forwards
HC Keski-Uusimaa players
KooKoo players
Lahti Pelicans players
Peliitat Heinola players
People from Heinola
Sportspeople from Päijät-Häme